Lim Tze Peng (born 28 September 1921) is a Singaporean artist who is a teacher by training and profession. He was awarded a Cultural Medallion in 2003 in recognition of his contribution to the country's art and culture. In June 2021, it was reported that he was still producing art at the age of 99.

Biography 
Lim was born in 1921 to a family of pig and chicken farmers in Pasir Ris. He is the eldest of seven children.

Lim studied at Guangyang Primary School and Chung Cheng High School.

In 1949, Lim became a primary school teacher at Xin Min School and then became principal in 1951. He remained as principal till he retired in 1981.

Painting career 
Lim started to learn to paint in his twenties and after his retirement, started to paint professionally.

In 2003, Lim was awarded the Cultural Medallion and in 2016, he was awarded the Pingat Jasa Gemilang (Meritorious Service Medal).

Major Exhibitions

Bibliography

References

External links
 NHB Press Release on exhibition Tze Peng in 2003
 Half length photograph portrait of Lim Tze Peng on National Library Board's Singapore Pages website

Living people
1921 births
Singaporean people of Chinese descent
Singaporean ink painters
Singaporean artists
Singaporean centenarians
Men centenarians
Recipients of the Cultural Medallion for art
Recipients of the Pingat Pentadbiran Awam
Recipients of the Pingat Bakti Masyarakat
Recipients of the Pingat Jasa Gemilang